Kahan Gaye Woh Log is an Indian television series that aired on DD National in 1985.

Cast 
 Dheeraj Kumar
 Sachin Kumar
 Rajendra Gupta

Awards 
 Aadhaarshila (Foundation) Award for Best Patriotic Serial given by then Vice President of India Mr. Shankar Dayal Sharma.

References

External links 

DD National original programming
1985 Indian television series debuts
1980s Indian television series